The 2004 BellSouth Open was a men's tennis tournament played on outdoor clay courts in Viña del Mar, Chile and was part of the International Series of the 2004 ATP Tour. It was the eleventh edition of the tournament and ran from February 9 through February 15, 2004. Fifth-seeded Fernando González won the singles title.

Finals

Singles

 Fernando González defeated  Gustavo Kuerten 7–5, 6–4
It was González's 1st singles title of the year and the 4th of his career.

Doubles

 Juan Ignacio Chela /  Gastón Gaudio defeated  Nicolás Lapentti /  Martín Rodríguez 7–6(7–2), 7–6(7–3)
It was Chela's 1st title of the year and the 3rd of his career. It was Gaudio's 1st title of the year and the 3rd of his career.

References

External links
 Official website 
 ATP tournament profile

BellSouth Open
Chile Open (tennis)
BellSouth Open